Anderson Bridge is a pedestrian bridge that spans across the Singapore River. It is located near the river's mouth in the Downtown Core Planning Area of Singapore's Central Area.

The bridge was completed in 1910, and was named after the Governor of the Straits Settlements and High Commissioner for the Federated Malay States (1904–1911), Sir John Anderson, who officially opened the bridge on 12 March 1910. It forms part of the Singapore Grand Prix's Marina Bay Street Circuit, which debuted on 28 September 2008.

On 15 October 2019, the bridge, along with Cavenagh Bridge and Elgin Bridge (collectively known as the Singapore River Bridges) was gazetted by the National Heritage Board as the 73rd National Monument of Singapore.

History

Anderson Bridge was built under oversight of Municipal Engineer Robert Peirce with the intention to replace the overloaded Cavenagh Bridge as the link between the government administrative area in the Civic District on the northern bank and the Commercial District (now Raffles Place) on the southern bank of the Singapore River. Due to the flourishing trade on the Singapore River by the 1880s, Cavenagh Bridge could not support the increasingly heavy traffic into town. Despite the building of Ord Bridge and Read Bridge, the traffic situation did not improve and in fact worsened following the widening of Battery Road. Its low draught was also insufficient for the passage of boats at high tide. However, when Anderson Bridge was completed in 1910, Cavenagh Bridge was spared from demolition and was converted to a pedestrian bridge, with all vehicles being diverted to Anderson Bridge.

Anderson Bridge was constructed between 1908 and 1910, as a joint venture between the colonial government and the Municipality after the reclamation of the south bank of the Singapore River. Construction of bridge cost £50,000 and was carried out by Howarth Erskine Ltd while the abutments were built by the Westminster Construction Company Limited.

The bridge comprises three steel arches with supporting steel ribs extending across them, two rusticated archways and a fluted pier at each end.

During the Japanese Occupation of Singapore (1942–1945), the severed heads of criminals were hung on Anderson Bridge as a warning to discourage citizens from breaking the law. 
In the 1990s, due again to the increasing vehicular traffic flow between the northern and southern bank of the Singapore River, the Esplanade Bridge was built to provide faster access between Marina Centre and the financial district of Shenton Way. Construction of the  bridge in front of the mouth of the Singapore River began in early 1994 and was completed in 1997.

Anderson Bridge currently still serves as a vehicular bridge, and connects the financial district directly to City Hall. The bridge is located near The Fullerton Hotel (previously Fullerton Building) and the Former Merlion Park. It also forms a distinctive part of the F1 Singapore Street Circuit.

On 3 November 2008, the bridge was selected for conservation as part of the Urban Redevelopment Authority's expanded conservation programme.

On 15 October 2019, the National Heritage Board gazetted Anderson Bridge, along with Cavenagh Bridge and Elgin Bridge (collectively known as the Singapore River Bridges) as the 73rd National Monument of Singapore. This was first announced by Deputy Prime Minister Heng Swee Keat on 3 August 2019, where the Padang is included as a future National Monument.

On 5 November 2021, authorities announced the conversion of Anderson Bridge to full pedestrianization from end December 2021, to increase the Civic District's walkability. The bridge was later converted to a pedestrian bridge, with all vehicles being diverted to Esplanade Bridge again.

See also
 List of bridges in Singapore
 The Fullerton Hotel

References

Bridges completed in 1910
Bridges in Singapore
Downtown Core (Singapore)
1910 establishments in Singapore
National monuments of Singapore
20th-century architecture in Singapore